This is a list of the weekly Canadian RPM magazine number one Top Singles chart of 1966.

See also
1966 in music

List of Billboard Hot 100 number ones of 1966 (United States)
List of Cashbox Top 100 number-one singles of 1966

References
Notes

External links
 Read about RPM Magazine at the AV Trust
 Search RPM charts here at Library and Archives Canada

1966 in Canadian music
Canada Singles
1966